Kiteboarding or kitesurfing is a sport that involves using wind power with a large power kite to pull a rider across a water, land, or snow surface. It combines the aspects of paragliding, surfing, windsurfing, skateboarding, snowboarding, and wakeboarding. Kiteboarding is among the less expensive and more convenient sailing sports.

After some concepts that emerged in the late 1970s and early 1980s and some designs were successfully tested, the sport received a wider audience in the late 1990s and became mainstream at the turn of the century.

It has freestyle, wave-riding, and racing competitions.

The sport held the speed sailing record, reaching  before being eclipsed by the  Vestas Sailrocket.

Worldwide, there are 1.5 million kitesurfers, while the industry sells around 100,000 to 150,000 kites per year.

The kitesurfer rides on either a bidirectional board (a "twin-tip", similar to a wakeboard), a directional surfboard, or a foilboard. They often wear a wetsuit in mild to cold waters. In the early days of the sport, there were significant injuries and some fatalities, but the safety record has improved with better equipment and instruction.

History

Late 20th century

 

In October 1977 Gijsbertus Adrianus Panhuise (Netherlands) received the first patent for KiteSurfing. The patent covers, specifically, a water sport using a floating board of a surf board type where a pilot standing up on it is pulled by a wind catching device of a parachute type tied to his harness on a trapeze type belt. This patent did not result in any commercial interest.

Through the 1980s, there were occasionally successful attempts to combine kites with canoes, ice skates, snow skis, water skis and roller skates.

Throughout the 1970s and early 1980s, Dieter Strasilla from Germany developed parachute-skiing and later perfected a kite-skiing system using self-made paragliders and a ball-socket swivel allowing the pilot to sail upwind and uphill but also to take off into the air at will. Strasilla and his Swiss friend Andrea Kuhn also used this invention in combination with surfboards and snowboards, grasskies, and self-made buggies. One of his patents describes in 1979 the first use of an inflatable kite design for kitesurfing.

Two brothers, Bruno Legaignoux and Dominique Legaignoux, from the Atlantic coast of France, developed kites for kitesurfing in the late 1970s and early 1980s and patented an inflatable kite design in November 1984, a design that has been used by companies to develop their own products.

Bill Roeseler, a Boeing aerodynamicist, and his son Cory Roeseler patented the "KiteSki" system, which consisted of water skis powered by a two-line, delta style kite, controlled via a bar-mounted combined winch/brake. The KiteSki was commercially available in 1994. The kite had a rudimentary water launch capability and could go upwind. In 1995, Cory Roeseler visited Peter Lynn at New Zealand's Lake Clearwater in the Ashburton Alpine Lakes area, demonstrating the speed, balance, and upwind angle on his 'ski'. In the late 1990s, Cory's ski evolved into a single board similar to a surfboard.

The development of modern-day kitesurfing by the Roeselers in the United States and the Legaignoux in France was carried on in parallel with that of buggying. 

In 1996, Laird Hamilton and Manu Bertin were instrumental in demonstrating and popularising kitesurfing off the coast of Maui, while, in Florida, Raphaël Baruch changed the name of the sport from flysurfing to kitesurfing by starting and promoting the first commercial brand of the industry: "Kitesurf".

In 1997, the Legaignoux brothers developed and sold the breakthrough "Wipika" kite design which had a structure of preformed inflatable tubes and a simple bridle system to the wingtips, both of which greatly assisted water re-launch. Bruno Legaignoux continued to improve kite designs, including developing the bow kite design, which has been licensed to many kite manufacturers.

In 1997, specialized kiteboards were developed by Raphaël Salles and Laurent Ness.  By the end of 1998 kitesurfing had become an extreme sport, distributed and taught through shops and schools worldwide. The first competition was held on Maui in September 1998 and won by Flash Austin.

Starting in 1999, kitesurfing became a mainstream sport with the entry of key windsurfing manufacturers, namely Robby Naish and Neil Pryde. Single direction boards derived from windsurfing and surfing designs became the dominant form of kiteboard.

21st century

In 2000, a new freestyle competition, sponsored by Red Bull was launched in Maui. The competition, named Red Bull King of the Air, judged riders on height, versatility, and style. The competition is still held annually in Cape Town, South Africa.

From 2001 onwards, twin-tip bi-directional boards became more popular for most flat water riders, with directional boards still in use for surf conditions.

In May 2012, the course racing style of kitesurfing was announced as a sport for the 2016 Rio Olympics, replacing windsurfing.  However, after a vote by the General Assembly of the ISAF in November 2012, the RSX windsurfer was reinstated for both Men and Women, resulting in kitesurfing being left out. The ISAF mid-year meeting of May 2013 proposed seeking an eleventh medal to include kitesurfing in 2020 without making any changes to existing events.

In 2014, course-racing kiteboarding was included in the ISAF World Sailing World Cup program. In November 2014, 20 athletes attended the final competition in Abu Dhabi. The first place among women was taken by Elena Kalinina, while the men's winner was Great Britain's Oliver Bridge.

In 2015, Elena Kalinina won again and received the title of the world champion, ahead of Great Britain's Stefania Bridge and Russian Anastasia Akopova. The world champion among men was Maxime Nocher from Monaco, making him the youngest world champion, ahead of Oliver Bridge and Polish native Blazek Ozog.

Kitesurfing was named an official event at the 2018 Summer Youth Olympics in Buenos Aires.

Mixed Kite - Formula Kite was chosen by World Sailing for inclusion in the 2024 Summer Olympics.

Kitesurfing Records

Jump records (height, length, time)

Nick Jacobsen achieved the world record for the highest kite jump, measured by WOO Sports on February 19, 2017 in Cape Town, South Africa, during a session with 40-knot winds. Jacobsen's jump reached 28.6 meters high, with an airtime of 8.5 seconds. The record has been broken several times since then, and WOO Sports maintains jump-related leaderboards in different categories (airtime, height, etc.) based on the data recorded and uploaded by its users. The current record holder for the height of a single jump is Jamie Overbeek at 35.3m.

Jesse Richman holds the record for hangtime at 22 seconds, set at Crissy Field in San Francisco, California. Airton Cozzolino holds the record for strapless hangtime at 19 seconds.

Speed records

French kitesurfer  became the first sailor to break the 50 knots barrier by reaching 50.26 knots on 3 October 2008 at the Lüderitz Speed Challenge in Namibia. On 4 October,   (also of France) broke this record with a 50.57 knots run. Similar speeds have been reached in the same location by windsurfers Anders Bringdal and Antoine Albeau, respectively 50.46 and 50.59 knots. These speeds are verified, but are still subject to ratification by the World Sailing Speed Record Council.  Earlier in the event, on 19 September, American Rob Douglas reached 49.84 knots (92.30 km/h), becoming the first kitesurfer to establish an outright world record in speed sailing. Previously the record was held only by sailboats or windsurfers. Douglas also became the world's third over-50 knots sailor, when on 8 October he made a 50.54 knots (93.60 km/h) run.

On 14 November 2009, Alex Caizergues completed another run of 50.98 knots in Namibia.

October 2010, Rob Douglas became the outright record holder for the short distance 500 meters with 55.65 knots. Sébastien Cattelan became the record holder of France and Europe with 55.49 and was the first rider to reach 55 knots.

On 13 November 2017, French rider  became the new world speed record holder in France (Salin-de-Giraud) reaching 57.97 knots or 107.36 km/h.

Largest kitesurfing wave 
Nuno "Stru" Figueiredo  
Nazaré - Portugal - 8 Nov 2017
19 mts World Record verified by IFKO and Guinness World Records

Long distance

Notable journeys 
Louis Tapper completed the longest recorded kite journey, completing 2000 km between Salvador and Sao Luis, Brazil. The journey was completed between July/August 2010 and took over 24 days of kitesurfing. This trip is also the longest solo journey, completed without a support crew, using one kite and a 35-liter backpack .

The previous longest recorded kite journey was by Eric Gramond who completed a 13-day trip of 1450 km along the coast of Brazil.

Bering Strait crossing 
Constantin Bisanz, a 41-year-old Austrian, crossed a  stretch of the Bering Strait, embarking from Wales, Alaska, US on 12 August 2011 at 04:00, and arriving in easternmost Russia two hours later, after which he returned by boat to Alaska. It occurred after 2 previously failed attempts, the first of which was on 28 July 2011, in which an incident occurred where he found himself floating in 36 °F water with no board, kite, or GPS unit for 1 hour before being rescued. On his second attempt on 2 August he and two friends sailed half the distance before turning around due to poor wind conditions.

Transatlantic crossing 
Each of the six spent four hours each day surfing, broken into two sessions of two hours each, one during the day, and the other during the night.

Environments
Kitesurfing on water includes freestyle and big air using a kiteboard similar to a wakeboard, kiting in waves using small surfboards with or without footstraps or bindings, foiling, and speed kiting.

Land kiting needs a short and light mountain board, feet steered buggies, rollerskates, or sand boards for sand kiteboarding, which is also referred to as "sand kiting". It is a great cross-training for kitesurfing as many of the mechanisms for kite control transfer to water use.

Skis or snowboards are used on snow for snowkiting.

Market
, the number of kitesurfers was estimated by the ISAF and IKA at 1.5 million persons worldwide (pending review). The global market for kite gear sales was then worth US$250 million.
The Global Kitesports Association (GKA) estimates 10% of the kitesurfers continue during winter.
After substantial growth, activity was levelling by 2017 at around 85,000 kites sold yearly by GKA members, twintip boards sales decreased from 37,000 in 2013 to 28,000 in 2016 and directional boards from 8,000 to 7,000.

The largest manufacturers are Boards and More (previously under the North brand, now Duotone), then Cabrinha (Neil Pryde) with 25–35,000 kites a year each.
They are followed by Naish, F-One, Core kiteboarding, Slingshot sports, Liquid Force, Airush, Ozone Kites, Flysurfer and others.
The GKA recorded 100,000 kites sales in 2017 for its members, giving an estimated 140–150,000 total kites sales for 2017.
Technavio predicted a global kiteboarding equipment market reaching US$2,120 million by 2021, growing at a CAGR of almost 9% from 2017.

Governance

International kiteboarding has several promoting organizations and has undergone many changes in the governance of the sport, including long-lasting disputes between several of those entities, trying to negate each other the right to promote sporting events. The significance of the associated economic activity could explain part of such turbulence, but the intense rate of innovation and of adoption made it difficult to conceive, regulate and formalize the new competitions, and offer opportunities for new players specializing in new variants of the sport.

Some of those international organizations are (or were):

 The Professional Kiteboard Riders Association (PKRA), and the Kiteboard Pro World Tour (KPWT), both of which promoted several international tour competitions since 2002, however not as Kiting governing bodies.
 The Global Kitesports Association (GKA) - Industry association which federates several industry stakeholders organizers of competition world tours.
 The International Federation of Kitesports Organizations (IFKO), established in 2016 as a not-for-profit kiters association, covering also land and snow kiting, claiming to be the only legal kiting governing body over WS.
 The World Kiteboarding League (WKL) which had promoted freestyle competitions in 2017.
 The Kiteboarding Riders United (KRU) which is an informal union of the professional kiteboarders, since 2016.
 The Kite Park League (KPL) which is dedicated to international competitions in kiteboarding parks.
 The International Kiteboarding Association (IKA), based in Gibraltar, a company, not an association, created by World Sailing to unite kite national associations. Organizer of several racing events tours.
 World Sailing (WS), formerly the International Sailing Federation (ISAF), a private company which has promoted sail and boating since 1907. Since 2008, the WS claims to affiliate the IKA as its kiteboard racing body.

Several world cup events are sanctioned by the WS on behalf of the International Olympic Committee, a private association.

KPWT exchanged endorsements with IKA in 2009. Both become opposing parties as the IKA also got an agreement with PKRA. IKA threatened and banned riders which take part in competitions without its endorsement.

In 2015, the PKRA was sold to a group of investors, becoming the Virgin Kitesurfing World Championship (VKWC).

The WS itself has split the governance of its own events between the GKA for the expression disciplines and the IKA for the racing disciplines. The GKA has then split the expression disciplines, choosing to run the Wave and Strapless Tour themselves, while ceding to the World Kiteboarding League to run the freestyle events and the Kite Park League to run the park events. The freestyle events were then handed to the Kiteboarding Riders United (KRU).

Styles

Several different kitesurfing styles are evolving, some of which cross over.

Styles of kiteboarding, include freestyle, freeride, speed, course racing, wakestyle, big air, park, and surfing.

Techniques

Kiteboarding can pose hazards to surfers, beachgoers, bystanders and others on the water. Many problems and dangers that may be encountered while learning kiting can be avoided or minimized by taking professional instruction through lesson centers. Kitesurfing schools provide courses and lessons to teach entry-level skills and more advanced ones, including:
 Kite, lines and bar handling and maintenance
 True and relative wind concepts, including basic kite navigation in the wind window
 Landing and launching the kite
 Kite assisted swimming, known as 'body dragging'
 Water start
 Relaunch and self-rescue techniques
 Navigation rules and best practices regarding safety
 Up-wind and down-wind navigation
 Basic turning or jibing up to "heel turn jibe"
 Dealing with surf and waves
 Pop and controlled jumping and flying
 Board grabs, tricks performed while a rider is jumping or has gained air from popping by grabbing the board in a number of positions with either hand. Each grab has a different name dependent on which part of the board is grabbed and with which hand grabs it. The names generally originate from other board sports like skateboarding and snowboarding

The wind

Wind strength and kite sizes
Kitesurfers change kite size and/or line length depending on wind strength — stronger winds call for a smaller kite to prevent overpower situations. Kitesurfers will determine the wind strength using either an anemometer or, more typically, visual clues as shown in the Beaufort scale. Modern kites dedicated to kitesurfing provide a "depower" option to reduce the power in the kite. By using depower, the kite's angle of attack to the wind is reduced, thereby catching less wind in the kite and reducing the pull.

Bow kites have a wider wind range than C-kites, so two kite sizes (such as 7 m2 and 12 m2) could form an effective quiver for winds ranging from 10 to 30+ knots for a 75 kg (165 lb) rider.

Wind direction and speed
Cross-shore and cross-onshore winds are the best for unassisted kiteboarding. Direct onshore winds carry the risk of being thrown onto land or stuck in shallows. Direct offshore winds pose the danger of being blown away from the shore in the event of equipment failure or loss of control. However offshore winds can be quite suitable in confined waters, like in a lake or estuary, or when a safety boat is assisting.

The kiter must maintain a clear perception of the wind direction but also of the wind speed. The Beaufort scale is of great assistance in helping users assess the situation. A range of wind up to 33 knots covers the conditions for a safe practice for an experienced rider. A less experienced one should avoid riding with more than 15 knots. Most twintip boards and inflatable kites would be barely rideable below 11 knots, therefore for most cases a user should focus on the winds classified as moderate up to strong.

Apparent wind 
Even if there is no wind blowing, a kiter can act on the kite lines and force it to move, and then, like with a row, it generates some force resulting from the incidence of the air into the kite's surface. In a gentle breeze, if the user action increases the air speed around the kite 10 times, the generated force increases 100 times, since the wind force acting on a kite is proportional to the square of the wind speed acting on it. Thus the relevant notion of apparent wind, which is the actual wind acting on the moving kite, sail or wing.

The apparent wind is measured taking the moving kite as the reference frame, therefore its other name as relative wind. By opposition, the wind measured relatively to the ground is called true wind.

While the other wind sports can generate considerable apparent wind, their wind forces are limited by the movement of the user platform, since it is attached more or less rigidly to the wing or sail. In this aspect, kiteboarding seems unique among other wind sports, since it allows the user to generate apparent wind independently of the movement of the user platform, the board. For instance, in the initiating kiteboard technic called waterstart, while the user prepares to start in the water, the kite is sent aggressively, generating a propulsive impulse. Then the resulting movement of the board increases tension on the kite lines, which the user controls to manage the riding speed and to navigate at will. The composition of the movements of both the kite and the board, offer the user a great deal of navigation flexibility and creativity, including the possibility to jump significantly, making this a true 3-dimensional sport.

Wind power, control lines and kite paths 
In some way all wind sports harvest the energy of the wind. The greater the volume of the atmosphere available to be harvested by the sails, the bigger the available energy to propel the users. As a taller sailing ship harvests more energy from the wind, so does a kiteboarder with longer lines. Compared to a kiteboarder, a windsurfer can extract a higher ratio of wind energy from the available atmosphere volume, but since such volume is much smaller, the resulting energy could be much less than in kiteboarding.

To increase the power, the kiteboarder typically navigates the kite along an S-shape path, increasing the harvesting of energy since it is traversing most of the atmosphere volume around him. This S-shaped movement is most common when the kiters need a moderate improvement of power. If the user needs an intense improvement of power, it loops the kite. Such loops are stronger when the loop radius is large, and traverses a larger atmosphere volume. The kite loop is an advanced practice, and its power can be quite dangerous. With most modern kites and control bars, to end a kite loop the user just pushes away or releases the bar.

Regarding the length of the lines connecting the kite to the user, longer lines allow the user to harvest wind energy in a larger volume.  Due to the boundary layer effect longer lines also allow to harvest stronger winds higher up in the atmosphere. But longer lines make the kite slower to respond to the user actions on the control bar, since the lines form a more pronounced spring-like catenary. Therefore, kitesurfers, who need to react fast to incoming waves, tend to use shorter lines than the other kiters. For safety reasons the newcomers to the sport are usually trained with short lines, limiting the power build up.

Wind window 
The wind window is the 180 degree arc of the sky downwind of the rider in which the kite can be flown - roughly one fourth of a sphere's surface, which radius is the length of the lines. It is the atmosphere volume in which the kiter can navigate the kite to harvest wind energy.

If the rider is facing downwind on a surface, like the ocean, the wind window covers roughly all the area the rider can see, from the rider's peripheral vision on one side, along the horizon to the other side, and then directly overhead back to the first side. If the rider somehow puts the kite out of the window — for example, by riding downwind too quickly and sending the kite directly overhead and behind, the kite will stall and often fall out of the sky.

The eventual inefficiency of the kite can obviate for it to reach the edge of the wind window. In such cases the magnitude of the wind window can be reduced to as little as a 120 degree arc, instead of the expected 180 degree.

The wind window is centered in the user location. Since the user is carried by the board, the wind window is affected by the movement of the board. Therefore, the wind window rotates as the board moves and generates apparent wind into itself. For instance, when the kiter navigates perpendicular to the true wind at a speed equal to the true wind's, the apparent wind felt on the board increases 42% compared to the true wind, but rotates 45º against the movement. With such rotation, even if the user keeps the kite at the very edge of the wind window for trying to keep it pulling in the travelling direction, the kite lines would be at an angle of 45º downwind of the board path, forcing the kiter to edge the board to oppose its tendency to slip downwind. Such board edging is an indispensable technique for navigating upwind, and can be made at a much more extreme angle to the kite lines, almost up to 90º.

The wind window rotation degrades the performance when riding fast in a path upwind. To minimize the wind window rotation and sail upwind as much as possible, the kiter should keep the slowest board speed without sinking the board by lack of hydrodynamic lift. High flotation boards like surfboards are preferable in such cases. Also, keeping the kite high in window, pulling up the user and the board, is quite efficient in coping both with the reduced hydrodynamic lift of the board and with the intended reduction of the board speed.

Arbitrary atmosphere volume swept by the kite 
The kite is a peculiar sail because it can be swept arbitrarily through the atmosphere, usually in specific patterns, so the user can harvest a significant amount of wind energy, much larger than with an equivalent sail fixed to a mast.

The kite and the lines are light, in the range between 2 and 4 kg, but the aerodynamic drag can be significant since the kite can travel much faster than a windsurf sail. Therefore, part of the energy harvested is spent in the movement of the kite itself, but the remainder propels the user and the board.

For instance, a user riding towards the beach rises the kite to slow it down and convert traction into lift. Then, instead of speed he feels an increase of the force upwards, necessary to keep himself above the breaking waves.

Another specific advantage of the kite being able to be swept at will, is that the user can take advantage of the atmosphere boundary layer, either rising the kite to harvest the stronger winds blowing in the higher zone of the wind window, or during overpowering gusts he can drive the kite low, skimming the water near the edge of the wind window.

Air temperature and humidity 
Seasoned kiteboarders frequently attribute to moist and hotter air a notable reduction in kite performance. In fact the lift force of a kite is proportional to the air density. Since both the temperature and the relative humidity are important detrimental factors in the air density, the kiters subjective valuation is correct.

In the range between 10 °C and 40 °C a kite loses approximately 0.4% of lift per degree Celsius. It means that a kiter practicing one given day in the Baltic, and then travelling to the Mediterranean, could experience 10% less pull using the very same kite at the very same wind speed.

Equipment 

With the development of Internet markets for used goods, used but reliable kiteboarding equipment has become much less expensive, significantly reducing the barrier to the adoption of the sport. Moreover, the sport is convenient regarding transportation and storage, since the kites are foldable and the boards are smaller than most surf and paddling boards.

Equipment depreciation can cost between £270 per year for second hand gear, to £1360 per year for brand new, not discounted kites and accessories.
In 2017, 150,000 kites were sold globally, compared to 400,000 surfboards sold each year.

Power kites

A power kite is available in two major forms: leading edge inflatables and foil kites.

Leading edge inflatables

Leading edge inflatable kites, known also as inflatables, LEI kites, are typically made from ripstop polyester with an inflatable plastic bladder that spans the front edge of the kite with separate smaller bladders that are perpendicular to the main bladder to form the chord or foil of the kite. The inflated bladders give the kite its shape and also keep the kite floating once dropped in the water. LEIs are the most popular choice among kitesurfers thanks to their quicker and more direct response to the rider's inputs, easy relaunchability if crashed into the water and resilient nature. If an LEI kite hits the water or ground too hard or is subjected to substantial wave activity, bladders can burst or it can be torn apart.

In 2005, Bow kites (also known as flat LEI kites) were developed with features including a concave trailing edge, a shallower arc in planform, and a distinctive bridle with multiple attachment points along the leading edge. These features allow the kite's angle of attack to be altered more and thus adjust the amount of power being generated to a much greater degree than previous LEIs. These kites can be fully depowered, which is a significant safety feature. They can also cover a wider wind range than a comparable C-shaped kite. The ability to adjust the angle of attack also makes them easier to re-launch when lying front first on the water. Bow kites are popular with riders from beginner to advanced levels. Most LEI kite manufacturers developed a variation of the bow kite by 2006.  Bow kites with a straight trailing edge are named ´delta´ kites, given their triangular outline.

Early bow kites had some disadvantages compared to classic LEI kites:

 They can become inverted and then not fly properly
 They can be twitchy and not as stable
 Heavier bar pressure makes them more tiring to fly
 Lack of "sled boosting" effect when jumping

In 2006, second generation flat LEI kites were developed which combine near total depower and easy, safe relaunch with higher performance, no performance penalties and reduced bar pressure. Called Hybrid or SLE kites (Supported Leading Edge), these kites are suitable for both beginners and experts.

In 2008, Naish introduced another kite design, with their "Sigma Series" of kites. These kites are a SLE design and feature a unique "bird in flight" shape with the center of the kite swept back to put much of the sail area behind the tow point, which Naish claims has multiple benefits.

In 2009, the performance revolution shows no sign of slowing. Bridled designs feel more like C kites, and five-line hybrids have better depower capability than ever before. There are more than thirty companies manufacturing Leading edge inflatable kites. The delta-kites are growing in popularity since 2008 with around 12 companies offering delta-kites since 2008/2009.

Between 2009 and 2013 kite technology has continued to grow.  Kites have become lighter, more durable, much easier to launch and safer.  Manufacturers have continued to add new safety features.  This has resulted in a growing number of new riders, both younger and older.  In 2013, there are at least 20 "major" kite manufacturers, each with multiple models available.  Many of the manufacturers are on their third or fourth generation of kites.

Foil kites

Foil kites are also mostly fabric (ripstop nylon) with air pockets (air cells) to provide it with lift and a fixed bridle to maintain the kite's arc-shape, similar to a paraglider. Foil kites have the advantage of not needing to have bladders manually inflated, a process which, with an LEI, can take up to ten minutes.
Foil kites are designed with either an open or closed cell configuration.

 Open Cell
 Open cell foils rely on a constant airflow against the inlet valves to stay inflated, but are generally impossible to relaunch if they hit the water, because they have no means of avoiding deflation, and quickly become soaked.

 Closed Cell
 Closed cell foils are almost identical to open cell foils except they are equipped with inlet valves to hold air in the chambers, thus keeping the kite inflated (or, at least, making the deflation extremely slow) even once in the water. Water relaunches with closed cell foil kites are simpler; a steady tug on the power lines typically allows them to take off again. An example for a closed cell kite is the Arc Kite.

Kite sizes
Kites come in sizes ranging from 0.7 square meters to 21 square meters, or even larger. In general, the larger the surface area, the more power the kite has. Kite power is also directly linked to speed, and smaller kites can be flown faster in stronger winds. The kite size—wind speed curve tapers off, so going to a larger kite to reach lower wind ranges becomes futile at a wind speed of around eight knots. Kites come in a variety of designs. Some kites are more rectangular in shape; others have more tapered ends; each design determines the kite's flying characteristics. 'Aspect ratio' is the ratio of span to length. High aspect ratios (ribbon-like kites) develop more power in lower wind speeds.

Seasoned kiteboarders will likely have three or more kite sizes which are needed to accommodate various wind levels, although bow kites may change this, as they present an enormous wind range; some advanced kiters use only one bow kite. Smaller kites are used by light riders, or in strong wind conditions; larger kites are used by heavier riders or in light wind conditions. Larger and smaller kiteboards have the same effect: with more available power a given rider can ride a smaller board. In general, however, most kiteboarders only need one board and one to three kites (7-12 sq m in size).

Other equipment

 Flying lines are made of a strong material such as ultra-high-molecular-weight polyethylene, to handle the dynamic load in unpredictable wind while maintaining a small cross-sectional profile to minimize drag. They come in lengths generally between seven and thirty-three meters. Experimentation with line lengths is common in kiteboarding. The lines attach the rider's control bar to the kite using attachment cords on the kite edges or its bridle. Most power kites use a 3, 4 or 5-line configuration. Most control bars have 4 lines, 2 for most of the propulsive power and 2 for steering and for control of the angle of attack. The 5th line is used to aid in re-launching or to further adjustment of the kite's angle of attack, mostly in C-kites.
 The control bar is a solid metal or composite bar which attaches to the kite via the lines. The rider holds on to this bar and controls the kite by pulling at its ends, causing the kite to rotate clockwise or counter-clockwise like a bicycle. Typically a chicken loop from the control bar is attached to a latch or hook on a spreader bar on the rider's harness. Most bars also provide a quick-release safety-system and a control strap to adjust the kite's minimum angle of attack. Kite control bars, while lightweight and strong, are usually heavier than water; "bar floats" made of foam may be fixed to the lines right above the harness to keep the bar from sinking if lost in the water. Control bars can be specific to a particular kite type and size and not suitable for use with different kite types.
 A kite harness comes in seat (with leg loops), waist, or vest types. The harness together with a spreader bar attaches the rider to the control bar. The harness reduces the strain of the kite's pull from the rider's arms, spreading it across part of the rider's body. This allows the rider to perform jumps and other tricks while remaining attached to the kite via the control bar. Waist harnesses are the most popular harnesses among advanced riders, although seat harnesses make it possible to kitesurf with less effort from the rider, and vest harnesses provide both flotation and impact protection. Kite harnesses resemble windsurfing harnesses, but with different construction; a windsurfing harness is likely to fail when used for kiteboarding.

 Kiteboard, a small composite, wooden, or foam board. There are now several types of kiteboards: directional surf-style boards, wakeboard-style boards, hybrids which can go in either direction but are built to operate better in one of them, and skim-type boards. Some riders also use standard surfboards, or even long boards, although without foot straps much of the high-jump capability of a kite is lost. Twin tip boards are the easiest to learn on and are by far the most popular. A new trend is kitesurfing with hydrofoil boards, which is difficult but opens new horizons to the riders by allowing them to ride in very low winds. The boards generally come with sandal-type footstraps that allow the rider to attach and detach from the board easily; this is required for doing board-off tricks and jumps. Bindings are used mainly by the wakestyle riders wishing to replicate wakeboarding tricks such as KGBs and other pop initiated tricks. Kiteboards come in shapes and sizes to suit the rider's skill level, riding style, wind and water conditions.

 A wetsuit is often worn by kitesurfers, except in warmer conditions with light winds. When kitesurfing in strong winds, body heat loss is reduced by wearing a wetsuit. A "shortie" is worn to protect the torso only, and a full suit is used for protection against cool conditions, from marine life such as jellyfish, and also from abrasions if the rider is dragged by the kite. Neoprene boots are required if the beach has much shellfish or hard rocks. Dry suits are also used to kitesurf in cold conditions in winter.
 A safety hook knife is considered required equipment. The corrosion resistant stainless steel blade is partially protected by a curved plastic hook. It can be used to cut entangled or snagged kite lines, or to release the kite if the safety release system fails. Some kitesurfing harnesses are equipped with a small pocket for the knife.
 A helmet is often worn by kitesurfers to protect the head from blunt trauma. Helmets prevent head lacerations, and can also reduce the severity of impact injuries to the head, as well as compression injuries to the neck and spine.
 A personal flotation device or PFD may be required if the kitesurfer is using a boat or personal water craft for support. It is also recommended for kitesurfing in deep water in case the kitesurfer becomes disabled and must wait for rescue.
 An impact vest provides some protection against impacts to the torso area. They also provide some flotation and preclude the harness to climb the chest and hurt the ribs, during high power maneuvers.
 A board leash that attaches the board to the kitesurfer's leg or harness is used by some riders. However, many kitesurfing schools discourage the use of board leashes due to the risk of recoil, where the leash can yank the board to impact the rider, which can result in serious injury or even death. Generally, kitesurfers that use a board leash will also wear a helmet to help protect against this.
 Signaling devices are useful if the kitesurfer needs to be rescued. This may be as simple as a whistle attached to the knife, or retro-reflective tape applied to the helmet. Some kitesurfers carry a mobile phone or two-way radio in a waterproof pouch to use in an emergency. A small Emergency Position-Indicating Radio Beacon (EPIRB) can be carried and activated to send out a distress signal.
 A buddy is important to help with launching and retrieving the kite, and to assist in an emergency.
 A GPS can be used to measure distance travelled, tracks and speed during a session.
 Poncho towels and changing robes are commonly used to dry off and get changed into and out of a wetsuit or swimwear waterside. Poncho towels are more commonly used in warmer weather, whereas changing robes typically have a waterproof shell and provide more insulation for colder temperatures.

Physical practice 

Kiteboarding is seen as a mid to high intensity exercise, but freeriding can be a low intensity practice like walking, and is usually done in long sessions of up to 2–3 hours. It is amenable to almost all ages, at least from teenagers up to 70 years old or more. It can be seen as a supplement or a substitute for other fitness practices.

Safety 

Power kites are powerful enough to pull the rider like a boat in wakeboarding and to lift their users to diving heights. An uncontrolled kite can be dangerous, especially in environments with solid obstacles. A rider can lose control from falling or from sudden wind gusts, which can occur in the presence of strong winds from squalls or storms ("collard").

It is possible to be seriously injured after being lofted, dragged, carried off, blown downwind or dashed, resulting in a collision with hard objects including sand, buildings, terrain or power lines or even by hitting the water surface with sufficient speed or height ("kitemare", a portmanteau of kite and nightmare). Adequate quality professional kiteboarding training, careful development of experience and consistent use of good judgement and safety gear should result in fewer problems in kiteboarding.

Weather 

Weather forecasting and awareness is the principal factor to safe kiteboarding. Lack of weather awareness and understanding the figures is frequent, but avoiding weather problems is possible. Choice of inappropriate locations for kiteboarding where the wind passes over land creating wind shadow, rotor with pronounced gusts and lulls has also factored in many accidents. Paying attention to the weather and staying within the limits of the riders ability will provide the safest experience. Kitesurfing close to storm fronts can be particularly dangerous due to rapid changes in wind strength and direction.

Aggravating factors 

Lack of a sufficient downwind buffer distance between the kiter and hard objects has contributed to accidents reducing the available distance and time for reaction. Jumping and being airborne at inappropriate places such as shallow water or near fixed or floating objects can be hazardous. Collisions with wind surfers, other kite boarders or water craft are hazards, particularly at busy locations.

Solo kiteboarding has been a frequent contributing cause to accidents; kiteboarders should try to kite with friends and keep an eye on one another. A kitesurfer can get farther from shore than an easy swim, which is the primary reason kitesurfing in directly offshore winds is discouraged. Marine hazards include sharks, jellyfish, sea otters, dolphins, and even crocodiles, depending on the location. Drowning has been a factor in severe accidents as well and may have been avoided in some cases through the use of an appropriate flotation aid or impact vest and development of acceptable swimming skills.

Safety equipment 

Some kite designs from late 2005 and onwards have included immediate and almost full depower integrated with the control bar and improved quick release mechanisms, both of which are making the sport much safer. However, lack of sufficient practice of emergency depowering the kite and going out in excessively strong or unstable weather can reduce the benefit of high depower kites.Another important part of the safety equipment is the impact vest, which doubles as an improved floatation device. It reduces the severity of eventual impacts, but also improves the user endurance in the long procedures of self-rescue in deep waters, which almost every freeriding kiter experiences sooner or later. It is also important and overlooked as a complement to the harness, precluding it to climb along the chest during powerful kite loops, which otherwise would hurt the ribs.The other important pieces of a reasonable safety kit are the safety hook knife to cut tangled lines, the helmet in a high visibility colour, a wet suit of reasonable thickness, depending on the water temperature, and possibly neoprene boots if the beach has much shellfish or hard rocks.

Statistics 

Accidents can generate serious injuries or even be deadly. 105 accidents were reported in the Kiteboarding Safety Information Database between 2000 and September 2003, with 14 fatalities. In South Africa between October 2003 and April 2004, 83% of search & rescue missions involving kitesurf were in offshore winds with the kite still attached to the harness, uncontrolled in strong winds or impossible to relaunch in weak winds. On 30 missions, there was no fatalities but five injuries : two had bone fractures after being hit by their boards, two others were suffering from critical hypothermia and exhaustion and the fifth was exhausted and lacerated.

Advances in hybrid and bow kite designs leads to a better ability to control the power that they provide and effective safety release systems.
 In 2003, fatality ratings for the U.S. stated that 6 to 12 kiteboarders died for 100,000 participants. This being higher than 4 to 5 in SCUBA diving (and much higher than the two Walkers), comparable to the 15 in Motor Vehicle Traffic, and 56 for Paragliders.

However these figures have to be correctly interpreted, since they do not account for the rate of accidents per hour of practice, which would be the telling index. Kiteboarding lends itself to a rather frequent practice, much like a gym program, arguably more frequent than other risky sports like scuba diving. Therefore, further data is required to properly evaluate the risk associated with kiteboarding.

Kitesurfing safety rules
While some countries have specific regulations on flying kites that may also apply to kitesurfing, most don't. However a kitesurfer should comply to the sailing rules regulating water crafts in many countries, like the U.S. Coast Guard regulations. Developed from such generic rules a set of kitesurf specific rules or recommendations has been taking form since the beginning of the sport.

The first such rule is the prudential rule: with so many people just discovering water sports, a kiter shouldn't assume others adequate knowledge, training or even proper attitude, and be prepared to observe self-preserving distances and always let the others perceive clearly its intentions and its intended path.

Waterstarters have priority: the rider going out from the beach has always priority over the riders coming in.

Kite High Rule - A kiter who is upwind (closest to the wind) must keep their kite high to avoid their lines crossing those of downwind kiters. Similarly, the downwind kiter must keep their kite low to avoid their lines crossing upwind kites. This applies regardless of whether kiters are on the same, or opposing courses.

Clearance Rule - A kiter while jumping must have a clear safety zone of at least 50m downwind because they will move downwind during the jump. A rider must also have a clear safety zone of 30m upwind to jump as his lines could touch the kite or the lines of another rider kiteboarding close by (see Kite High rule). It's important to also consider potential hazards downwind and crosswind of the rider such as people, buildings, trees and other fixed obstacles. Because of the clearance rule a jumper never has the right of way.

Kiters are also considered as sailing vessels – so all the standard sailing rules apply such as:

Starboard Rule When kiters approach from opposite directions the kiter who has the wind on the starboard (right side, right leg/arm leads in direction of travel) has right of way. The kiter who has the wind on the port side (left side, left leg/arm are leads in direction of travel) shall keep out of the way of the other. In simple terms, this means "keep right" with the kiter coming in the opposite direction passing on the left.

In sailing terms, a sailor or kiter with right of way is entitled to "insist" on exercising that right (warning opposing kiters) by shouting "starboard" clearly and in good time.

Many of the sailing rules of right of way are different expressions that the most maneuverable craft should give way to the less maneuverable one. Therefore, kiters should give way to fishing vessels, but not to a jet ski. Other boating rules such as no-go zones, distance from shore and swimmers also apply. Also surfing rules do apply, so for instance, the rider to catch a wave closer to the crest has the right of way even if not on a starboard tack, freeriders included.

Terminology and jargon 
 Air time: the amount of time spent in the air while jumping. This can be remarkably long; the record is Jesse Richman's 22 second long jump. Five to ten seconds is not unusual.
 Apparent wind: the kite's speed relative to the surrounding air. When kitesurfing in a straight line, the kite's apparent wind is a combination of the wind speed and the speed of the kite over the surface, but since the kite is highly steerable the apparent wind can vary widely depending on how the kite is being flown. Most ways of increasing power from the kite involve giving it a higher apparent wind somehow, i.e. diving the kite, riding faster, or riding at a greater angle into the wind. Any of these raises the kite's apparent wind speed.
 Back stall: A condition in which the kite ceases to move forward through the air and becomes difficult to control, often resulting in the kite flying backwards and crashing.  Back stall is often caused by lack of wind or by flying the kite with too great of an angle of attack. 
 Big air: performing a high jump utilizing the lift of the kite. The jump is often assisted in its initial stage by the rider being catapulted off the lip of a wave.
 Body dragging: being pulled through the water without standing on a board. This is an early step in the learning process, and is essential before trying the board after flying a trainer kite.
 Boost: to suddenly become airborne
 Brain fart: to forget what trick you intended to perform mid air and end up crashing or landing on the water.
 Chicken loop: a hard rubber loop attached to the middle line which has been fed through the control bar. It is used to attach the control bar to the harness so the kitesurfer can produce tension in the lines using their entire bodyweight instead of using purely arm strength.
 Chicken dick / chicken finger/ donkey dick / donkey tail: a hard rubber "tongue" attached to the chicken loop which the rider feeds through the spreader bar hook to prevent the rider from becoming "unhooked".
Deathloop: when a kite performs an uncontrollable loop with the kiteboarder still attached, often resulting in serious injuries. See also Kitemare
 De-power: to reduce the kite's power (pull), generally by adjusting the angle of attack of the kite. Most kites and control bars now allow a rider to rig a kite for a number of different power levels before launching, in addition to powering the kite up and down "on the fly" by moving the bar up and down. Depowerability makes a kite safer and easier to handle. Some new kite models, especially "bow" kites, can be de-powered to practically zero power, giving them an enormous wind range.
 DP: dawn patrol; an early morning session.
 Downwind: the direction the wind is blowing towards; to leeward. When a rider is facing downwind the wind is at their back.
 Downwinder: a kitesurfing "trip" (could actually be as short as a few minutes) where the rider starts at one point and ends up at another point downwind of their original position.
 Edge: tilting the board with its edge into the water. Used to control the direction of travel. Learning to edge properly is critical for learning to tack upwind. Edging is one of the fundamental skills of kitesurfing and is one of the ways kitesurfing is different from windsurfing or wakeboarding. While windsurf boards have daggerboards and/or skegs to steer the board upwind while lift and planing is provided by the board itself, generally kiteboards actually combine both functions and the bottom of the board lifts the rider and steers simultaneously. Kiteboard fins are generally much smaller and are for keeping the board in the water (see "tea-bagging"), but are not essential. Because kite boards have a small rocker, a deep edge can allow the board to act as a large low drag fin. Edging in wakeboarding is used for steering the board; whereas in kite boarding not only does edging steer the kite board, it is essential for kite control and controlling board speed. Riding downwind towards the kite subtracts massively from the kite's power and helps control board speed as well.
 Facial: total loss of flying kite control while on the beach, resulting in the harnessed rider being dragged face first downwind across rocks and sand.
 Freeride: kiteboarding style. Plain kiteboarding that does not involve tricks or jumping. The main goal is keeping a good edge and ability to traverse upwind. This would normally require a board with little rocker.
 Freestyle: kiteboarding style. Freestyle involves tricks (or combinations of tricks) where the rider is jumping off the water and experiencing enhanced elevation using lift generated from the kite. Freestyle is, weather-wise, a multi-condition concept and is to some degree equipment-specific. "Big air" is commonly associated with freestyle.
 Goofy: the footedness of the rider, with the right foot leading.
 Guinea pig a person who goes out to test if the wind is rideable or not. If it is, others start riding too. Also known as a Wind-dummy.
 Heel side: the side of a board on the edge where a rider's heels are (opposite of toe side). "Riding heel side" is riding with heels down.
 Hindenburg: (a reference to the Hindenburg Airship disaster of 1937) a kite falling out of the air due to the loss of tension in the control lines, and therefore the loss of kite control. Hindenburging can be caused either by lack of wind or by the kite advancing to a position upwind of the kitesurfer in the wind window, also called "overflying the kite".
 Handlepass: while unhooked, passing the control bar behind a riders back while in the air. This is one of the main trick categories in Wakestyle
 Hot launch: recovering and launching the kite from a position deep inside the wind window so the kite is immediately under maximum power (potentially dangerous). 
 Kiter: the person driving the kite. 
 Kiteloop: is a powered group of tricks where a rider loops the kite through the power zone.
 Kitemare: a kiteboarding accident or dangerous mishap. Kitemares can be deadly.
 Launch: getting the kite in the air. The kite may be launched assisted or unassisted. An assisted launch is generally safer than an unassisted launch.
 Lofted: to get lifted vertically into the air by the kite due to a strong gust of wind. Being lofted has resulted in fatalities when kiters on or near land were dragged into obstacles. The danger can be avoided by minimizing time on land with the kite flying directly overhead, and by not kiting in overpowered situations.
 Luff: when the air flow stalls around the kite. It may then stall and fall out of the sky. Like sails, a luffing kite has rippling and flapping panels. When launching the kite, if the kite is luffing, the rider should move farther upwind, or the person holding the kite should move downwind.
 Mobe: this term has two meanings: either a class of wakestyle tricks involving an invert with a 360-degree spin or a specific trick involving a back roll with a frontside 360 handlepass (while keeping the kite below 45 degrees).  The former meaning stems from the latter, which was the first type of mobe to ever be landed. Other types of mobes include: mobe 540, mobe 720, slim chance, KGB, crow mobe, moby dick, Pete Rose, blind pete, crow mobe 540, etc.
 Nuking: wind blowing at great speeds (30-40 knots). These extreme conditions are dangerous for most riders.
 Offshore: wind blowing at the water from the shore. Never ride in offshore winds without some means of recovery, i.e. a chase boat. This is somewhat less important in smaller bodies of water, of course.
 Onshore: wind blowing perpendicular to and directly at the shore from the water. A challenging condition for beginners, especially if waves are present.
 Dookie dive: loss of power during air time resulting in a crash into the water.
 O-Shit loop: two loops on either ends of the bar that are attached to the kite lines and run through rings attached to the bar. A standard leash attachment point.
 Overhead waves: waves  or larger from trough to crest;
 Overpowered: the condition of having too much power from the kite. Can be a result of an increase in wind, incorrect kite choice (too large for the conditions), incorrect adjustment, simply going too fast, etc. Experienced riders who are overpowered can switch to a smaller board to compensate, to a degree, although it's common to have just one board.
 Pop: height gained above the water using only the board and tension in the lines to get lift, with the kite usually positioned at 45 degrees. Lower kite angles are possible for more experienced riders. Used as a basis for many tricks and regarded as an essential skill for progressing.
 Port the left side of a vehicle, as perceived by a person on board facing the bow (front).
 Power up: when the kite's power increases (suddenly), because of wind gusts or the kite's movement.
 Power zone: is the area in the sky where the kite generates the most lift (pull), this is generally between 0 and 60 degrees arc from the center of the downwind direction.
 Raley / Railey: a trick where the rider unhooks and then pops in order to fully extend his body into a "superman" position, before landing. This is a power move that's often performed relatively low to the water and forms the basis of more advanced tricks.
 Regular: the footedness of the rider, with the left foot leading.
 Re-launch: a general term for getting the kite back up in the air after crashing it (on land or water). A relaunch is unassisted and requires the rider to follow a kite-specific procedure (check the manual). As years of development have gone by, the more recent kites are easier to relaunch.
 Rider: kiteboarder.
 S-Bend: when the rider unhooks and performs a raley followed by a front roll. 
 Self rescue: a maneuver by which a rider with a downed kite manipulates the kite in the water to assist them in swimming back to shore.  The rider generally wraps up their lines until they reach their kite, then positions their kite so that it is on its back as it would be carried on land but with the wing-tip closer to shore catching the wind.  This wing tip acts as a sail and helps pull the rider to shore.  This is considered an important manoeuvre to learn.
 Send it: to move the kite aggressively up through the power zone.
 Schlogging: this is riding extremely underpowered. A rider has no power to plane and definitely not enough to jump. A rider and their board bounce from planing on the surface to being dragged in the water.
 Shit hot: the art of stylish smooth moves.
 SLE: Supported Leading Edge. A C shaped kite with an inflatable leading edge, currently the most advanced kite design available allowing massive de-power.
 Side offshore: wind blowing between sideshore and at a 45-degree angle away from the shore.
 Side onshore: wind blowing between sideshore and at a 45-degree angle towards the shore.
 side shore: winds blowing parallel to the shore. Usually the most desirable direction for kitesurfing.
 Spreader bar: a stainless steel bar that attaches to the rider's harness. It has a hook that holds the "chicken loop" when riding hooked in.
 Starboard the right side of a vehicle as perceived by a person on board facing the bow (front).
 Stomp: to successfully perform a trick.
 Surfstyle: Wave riding using surfboards. Ideal conditions are cross shore to cross offshore with the wind blowing in the same direction that the wave is breaking. Boards can be ridden with or without foot straps.
 Tack: the direction which is being sailed, normally either starboard tack or port tack. In a starboard tack the wind is coming in from the rider's starboard (right-hand) side, similar to sailing a boat. In normal riding, the kitesurfer takes a heading which is as close to into the wind as possible, and in any event leads at some angle slightly upwind, sometimes as much as 45 degrees; jumping or wave riding usually results in traveling downwind, so the net result is to maintain relative position. Alternatively, see "downwinder".
 Tea-bagging: popping out of and falling back into the water intermittently due to light or gusty wind, poor flying skills, twisted lines etc.
 Toe side: the side of a board on the edge where a riders toes are (opposite of heel side). "Riding toe side" is riding with toes down.
 Underpowered: the condition of having insufficient power from the kite. Can be a result of insufficient wind, choosing a kite that is too small for the wind, rigging incorrectly, board too small, water current in the same direction as the wind, not riding fast enough, etc. A rider who is continuously diving the kite and sending it back up in a sine-wave pattern is usually underpowered.
 Unhooked is when a kitesurfer is riding while the chicken loop is not attached to the rider's harness.
 Upwind: the direction from which the wind is blowing; windward; into the wind.
 VaS conditions: Victory at Sea; rough sea conditions characterized by overhead wind waves causing severe shore break.
 Wakestyle: A style of kiteboarding in which the rider usually uses wakeboarding (or kiteboarding) "boots" for their kiteboard (as opposed to straps and pads), ensuring their feet remain firmly attached at all times (hense the term "Wakestyle").  This style is also associated with performing powered tricks with the kite as low to the water as possible (something generally perceived by kiteboarders to be more difficult and stylish).
 Walk of shame is the act of beach walking back upwind to the location where the kite was originally launched. It could mean that the kiter wasn't able to sail upwind.
 Wind-dummy a person who goes out to test if the wind is rideable or not. If it is, others start riding too. Also known as a Guinea pig.
 Zenith the location in the wind window directly over the kiter's head. This is the neutral position where kitesurfers can place the kite to stop moving or prior to movement. This places the kite in a more vulnerable to "Hindenburgs" position than any other.

Market data 
, the number of kitesurfers was estimated by the ISAF and IKA at 1.5 million persons worldwide (pending review). The global market for kite gear sales is worth US$250 million. The markets related to kiteboarding keep developing at a very interesting pace, as seen in these statistics from 2012:

 60,000 new kiters annually 
 180,000 kites sold annually 
 75,000 boards sold annually 
 14 board builders 
 19 kite builders

Evolution of kite sales, worldwide:

 1999:  29,000
 2006: 114,465
 2008: 140,000
 2012: 180,000

Keep in mind that a kiteboarding quiver for a single user could typically include 2-4 kites and 2-3 boards. With the innovation associated with foil boards and foil kites these numbers will increase. With the exception of foil kites, these equipment pieces are quite rugged and would last from 3 up to 10 years of active use, and be repaired and resold several times. This aftermarket further improves the market development, removing cost barriers for newbies which improves the popularity of the sport, and eventually could bring up new products and services based on a much larger market scale. In locations like Portugal in 2018, a newcomer to kiteboarding typically buys a proper hands-on tutorial and then buys a basic set of used equipment for an overall total below €1000.

The sport is utterly convenient regarding transportation and storage, since the kites are foldable and the boards are smaller than surf and paddling boards. Compared to other sailing sports, kiteboarding is among the less expensive and more convenient. Moreover, nearby most metropolitan areas, it can be practised almost all year long, since it just requires some wind and a reasonably flat surface, like an estuary, a lake, a sandy strip, or a snow flat.

Despite the image of a youth radical sport, many newcomers are middle age, older than the typical wakeboard or snowboard practitioners. Such trends are quite conspicuous, not so much in the trendy summer holiday locations, but in the low season in metropolitan areas around the globe, where kiteboarding is becoming a regular practice for people of middle income, living in apartments not so close to the waterfront, for a short evasion and substituting for the gym.

Compared to windsurfing

World Champions

See also

 Foilboard
 Kite applications
 Kite landboarding
 Kite mooring
 Kiteboating
 Kite rig
 SkySails
 Snowkiting
 Windsport
 Wing foiling

References

External links

Air sports
Kites
 
Articles containing video clips
Surfing
Racing
Individual sports
Boardsports